This is a list of alumni and faculty associated with Tsarskoye Selo Lyceum. During 33 years of the Tsarskoe Selo Lyceum's existence, there were 286 graduates.

Alumni by year of entrance

1811

Prince Alexander Gorchakov (1798–1883), diplomat
Konstantin Danzas (1801–1870), Major General
Baron Anton Delvig (1798–1831), poet and journalist
Wilhelm Kuchelbecker (1797–1846), poet and Decembrist
Sergey Lomonosov (1799–1857), diplomat
Fyodor Matyushkin (1799–1872), admiral and senator
Alexander Pushkin (1799–1837), poet
Ivan Pushchin (1798–1859), Decembrist
Pavel Yudin (1798–1852)

Other years
Nicholas de Giers
Dmitry Tolstoy
Jacob Grot
Nikolay Danilevsky
Aleksey Lobanov-Rostovsky
Fyodor Shcherbatskoy
Mikhail Saltykov-Shchedrin
Mikhail Petrashevsky
Peter Saburov
Alexander Bulatovich
Alexandr Aksakov
Alexey Yermolov
Sergey Sazonov
Vladimir Lambsdorff
Alexander Izvolsky

Notable faculty
Pafnuty Chebyshev

References

External links
 Tsarskoselsky Litsey.
 List of Tsarskoye Selo Lyceum alumni.

Tsarskoye Selo Lyceum